State Route 657 in Fairfax County, Virginia is a secondary state highway which traverses the western portion of the county. It runs 8.4 miles from SR 28 near the boundary between Centreville and Chantilly to SR 228 at the town limits of Herndon.

Route description
SR 657 uses two different names: Walney Road and Centreville Road.

Walney Road

The southern terminus of SR 657 is at SR 28 (Sully Road), just north of Interstate 66.  The terminus is a Right-in/right-out intersection that only allows traffic from and to northbound SR 28.  Walney Road is a two-lane undivided road for most of its length, widening to a four-lane divided highway about 0.3 miles south of US 50.

The southern section of Walney Road passes through Ellanor C. Lawrence Park.  North of the park, Walney Road tends to divide business parks from residential areas before ending in the traditional center of Chantilly at US 50.

Centreville Road

North of US 50, SR 657 becomes Centreville Road, a divided highway, mostly four lanes wide except at its northern end.  There are commercial districts at the southern and northern ends; otherwise most of Centreville Road also divides business parks from residential areas.

SR 657 ends by changing into SR 228 at the southern town limit of Herndon between Parcher Avenue and Herndon Parkway.  The street name also changes at the town line (to Elden Street).  This is about 0.3 miles north of the SR 267 interchange.

History
SR 657 was the primary travel route between Centreville and Herndon for much of the 20th century.  From September 1961 to August 1966, the section south of US 50 was part of SR 28.

Major intersections

References

657 Fairfax
State Route 657
State Route 657